The University of Plymouth Colleges (UPC) network is a partnership between the University of Plymouth and local colleges to deliver a range of higher education courses in Bristol, Cornwall, Devon, Dorset and Somerset, as well as the Channel Islands. The network began in 1989 with the Polytechnic South West. The polytechnic entered into partnership agreements with local FE colleges in Cornwall, Devon and Somerset to extend the provision of HE opportunities. The initial intake was 450 students. By 1992, the polytechnic had become the University of Plymouth, 
and the network was devised as the UPC in 2003. 
In 2004, the UPC was launched as a faculty within the university with its own Dean, 
and by 2007, student numbers had reached 9,500 students. The dean is Colin Williams.

In Bristol, UPC includes the City of Bristol College. In Cornwall, it includes Cornwall College, Truro College and Penwith College. In Devon, it includes Bicton College, City College, Plymouth, Exeter College, Exeter, Petroc, and South Devon College. In Dorset, it includes Weymouth College. In Somerset, it includes Bridgwater College, Somerset College of Arts and Technology (SCAT), and Strode College. In the Channel Islands, it includes Highlands College, Jersey.

References

External links 
 

Education in Devon
Colleges
Educational institutions established in 2004
2004 establishments in England